The Perfect Murder is a 1988 English-language Indian film directed by Zafar Hai  and  produced by Merchant-Ivory. The film is based on the 1964 novel The Perfect Murder by British crime fiction writer HRF Keating and stars Naseeruddin Shah as Inspector Ghote, the leading character in Keating's novels. Swedish actor Stellan Skarsgård as well as many noted Indian actors such as Madhur Jaffrey, Amjad Khan, Dalip Tahil, Ratna Pathak, Annu Kapoor and Johnny Walker appear in the film.

Plot
Police Inspector Ghote lives a middle-class life in Bombay along with his wife, Pratima. He has been employed with the Bombay Police for many years. His wife is generally disgruntled and wants a better life. He is assigned to investigate the deadly assault on a Parsi man named Perfect, who is the Secretary of Lala Heera Lal, a wealthy man with underworld links. Inspector Ghote commences his investigation and is displeased when his superiors ask him to work with a Swedish Forensic expert, Axel Svennson. Axel is thrilled to get a closer look at the working of the Bombay Police, but realizes that Ghote may not be one of their best police officers. When their friendship develops, he gets invited to Ghote's house, and meets Pratima. Their investigation, though prima facie simple enough, takes them through turns and twists that both had not expected - including corridors of power and corruption - and finally to the conclusion and the unmasking of the culprit(s) behind this incident.

Cast
Naseeruddin Shah as Inspector Ganesh Ghote
Stellan Skarsgård as Axel Svensson
Amjad Khan as Lala Heera Lal
Madhur Jaffrey as Mrs. Lal
Annu Kapoor as Tiny Man
Archana Puran Singh as Miss Twinkle
Dalip Tahil as Dilip Lal
Sakina Jaffrey as Nina Lal
 Dinshaw Daji as Mr. Perfect
Johnny Walker as Jain
Mohan Agashe as A.C.P. Samant
Rajesh Vivek as Zero Police
Ratna Pathak as Pratima Ghote (as Ratna Pathak Shah)
Salim Ghouse as Caste-Marks Goonda
Sameer Kakkad as Felix Sousa
Vinod Nagpal as Minister
Gopi Krishna as Dance Master 
Pearl Padamsee as Nurse
Lilliput as Short Man-Goonda
Imaad Shah as Ved Ghote (The little child)

Reception
DVD Talk said, "It's all very cute, but as with much of the humor in The Perfect Murder, we're never sure we're fully understanding the joke."

References

External links

English-language Indian films
Merchant Ivory Productions films
1980s mystery films
1980s crime films
Indian crime films
Indian detective films
British mystery drama films
1988 films
1980s police procedural films
1980s British films